IDOM is a multi-national corporation which provides consulting, engineering, and architecture services in Spain and internationally.

From 1957 to the present day, IDOM has gradually developed into a multidisciplinary group in which more than 3,000 people work, distributed in 34 offices located in seventeen countries and five continents, having served more than 12,000 clients and carrying out 30,000 projects in 123 countries.

History 
IDOM (from the Spanish: Ingeniería y Dirección de Obras y Montaje) was founded in 1957 by Rafael Escolá (1919-1995), with the help of another young engineer, Luis Olaortúa (1932-2003).

References

External links 
 Official Website
 IDOM on archilovers
 IDOM on Architect Magazine

Organisations based in Bilbao
Basque companies
Spanish companies established in 1957
Design companies established in 1957
Architecture firms of Spain